Nothing Fancy is the second studio album by Canadian country music singer Jessie Farrell. It was released on October 9, 2007 by 604. "Let's Talk About Love," "Fell Right Into You," "Best of Me" and "I Guess" have all been released as singles.

Track listing
"Let's Talk About Love" (Jessie Farrell, Jesse Tucker) – 3:31
"I Guess" (Farrell, Tucker) – 2:46
"Fell Right Into You" (Farrell, Tucker) – 4:13
"Best of Me" (Farrell, Jared Kuemper, Tucker) – 4:28
"Lucky" (Farrell, Tucker) – 2:44
"Sorry for You" (Farrell, Tucker) – 3:20
"Falling Asleep (In Your Arms)" (Farrell, Tucker, Jim Vallance) – 4:13
"Prettiest Things" (Farrell, Tucker) – 3:17
"I Am a Rock" (Farrell, Tucker) – 2:57
"Coming Home (Jono's Song)" (Farrell, Tucker) – 3:42

Personnel
Steve Dawson - banjo, dobro
John Dymond - bass guitar
Jessie Farrell - acoustic guitar, lead vocals, background vocals
Paul Franklin - pedal steel guitar
Shannon Gaye - background vocals
Rob Hajacos - fiddle
Jared Kuemper - keyboards, string arrangements, background vocals
Brent Mason - electric guitar
Steve O'Connor - Fender Rhodes, organ, piano, Wurlitzer
Jesse Zubot - fiddle, mandolin

External links
[ allmusic ((( Nothing Fancy > Overview )))]

2007 albums
604 Records albums
Jessie Farrell albums
Albums produced by Garth Fundis